The list of shipwrecks in January 1824 includes some ships sunk, foundered, grounded, or otherwise lost during January 1824.

1 January

2 January

3 January

4 January

5 January

6 January

7 January

8 January

9 January

11 January

12 January

13 January

14 January

17 January

18 January

20 January

22 January

23 January

24 January

25 January

26 January

28 January

29 January

30 January

Unknown date

References

1824-01